WRAU may refer to:

 WGBZ (FM) 88.3 MHz, Ocean City, Maryland — used the call sign WRAU from 2010 to June 2021
 WGNH 94.9 MHz, South Webster, Ohio — used the callsign WRAU from 2002 to 2004
 WRAZ-FM 106.3 MHz, Leisure City, Florida — used the callsign WRAU from March 2000 to July 2001
 WPKE-FM 103.1 MHz, Coal Run, Kentucky — used the callsign WRAU from 1990 to 1993
 WRZZ 106.1 MHz, Parkersburg, West Virginia — used the callsign WRAU from 1986 to 1988
 WHOI (TV) channel 19, Peoria, Illinois — used the callsign WRAU-TV from 1973 to 1985